Arlene Vincent-Mark (born 6 October 1954) is a retired Grenadian long-distance runner who represented her country at the 1988 Summer Olympics in the women's marathon, placing 62nd.

References

Living people
1954 births
Grenadian female athletes
Olympic athletes of Grenada
Athletes (track and field) at the 1988 Summer Olympics
Female marathon runners